Conor Fitzsimmons (born 7 May 1998) is a professional rugby league footballer who plays as a  or  for the York Knights in RFL Championship.

Playing career

Castleford Tigers
Fitzsimmons commenced his top-level playing career in the 2016 Super League season with Castleford (Heritage № 968).

Newcastle Thunder
In November 2017 he signed for Newcastle. He has previously played for English Super League club Castleford and spent the 2017 season on loan with Workington Town.

Workington Town
Fitzsimmons signed for Workington Town for the 2020 season and in was named their 'Player of the Year' in 2022.

York City Knights
In October 2022, he joined the York RLFC on a two-year deal.

References

External links
Newcastle Thunder profile
Castleford Tigers profile
SL profile

1998 births
Living people
Castleford Tigers players
English rugby league players
Newcastle Thunder players
Rugby league hookers
Rugby league locks
Rugby league players from Workington
Workington Town players
York City Knights players